The 7th Reconnaissance Squadron is a squadron of the United States Air Force.  It is assigned to the 69th Reconnaissance Group and is stationed at Naval Air Station Sigonella, Sicily, Italy.

The squadron was first established in the Panama Canal Zone as the 7th Aero Squadron in 1917 and served as a reconnaissance unit until 1942, when it was redesignated as the 397th Bombardment Squadron.  It served as a bomber unit through World War II and was inactivated at Rio Hato Army Air Base, Panama on 1 November 1946.  The squadron was reactivated in 2015, returning to its earlier reconnaissance mission.

History

The squadron's mission from its inception in 1917 to its inactivation in 1946 was the defense of the Panama Canal.  During the 1920s and 1930s it participated in a number of goodwill missions to nations in Central and South America.  From its origins in 1917 until 1942, the unit was designated a variation of the 7th Reconnaissance Squadron.

World War I

With the entry of the United States into World War I, the War Department believed it was necessary to establish an air presence along the Atlantic terminus of the Panama Canal as a defensive measure against an enemy seaborne attack.

In advancing its plans for the defense of the Atlantic and Gulf coasts of the United States, the joint Army-Navy board recommended the establishment of eight aeronautic stations which, with a strength of two dirigibles and six or eight seaplanes each, could immediately conduct patrol work. Significantly, the only site definitely advanced as vital in the overall plan was that at the Coco Solo United States Navy submarine base near Colón in the Canal Zone.

The Army selected Captain Henry H. Arnold, then in training at the Army Aviation School at Rockwell Field, near San Diego, to proceed immediately to the Canal Zone and form and command an aviation squadron there. This unit was designated the 7th Aero Squadron and was organized on 29 March 1917. Captain Arnold did not remain long with the 7th Aero Squadron, however, as he returned to the United States in April 1917. The squadron personnel arrived for duty in the Canal Zone with 51 officers and enlisted men.  Initially garrisoned at Ancón, Canal Zone at the end of March 1917, the unit moved to Corozal by 16 April. They then moved to the large temporary camp at Empire, Canal Zone in May, all on the Pacific side of the isthmus – not making the move to Fort Sherman's parade field until around 29 August 1917, on the Atlantic side.  The unit did not receive its first aircraft until about 10 December 1917, when two Curtiss R-4's were tested at Fort Sherman. These were followed by Curtiss R-6's on 12 February 1918 which were supplied by the Navy. Besides its Curtiss R-4's and R-6's, the unit also had two Curtiss R-3's which, oddly, had arrived after the R-4's, in late December 1917.

With the end of World War I most of the 7th Aero Squadron's personnel were transferred back to the United States for demobilization.

Between the wars

After the war, the squadron evolved into the 7th Squadron (14 March 1921), 7th Observation Squadron (25 January 1925), 7th Reconnaissance Squadron (1 September 1937), 7th Reconnaissance Squadron (Medium Range) (6 December 1939) and 7th Reconnaissance Squadron (Heavy) (20 November 1940) before being finally redesignated as the 397th Bombardment Squadron (Heavy) on 22 April 1942.  The squadron was assigned to the 6th Composite Group.

After World War I, the squadron is credited with having operated numerous aircraft types between 1919 and 1931. These included, the venerable U.S.-built Dayton-Wright DH-4 series of light bomber/general purpose aircraft; the Curtiss JN-4 "Jenny" family of trainers; the Loening OA-1 amphibians, these being uniquely suited to conditions in Panama, Douglas O-2 observation aircraft and, surprisingly, Curtiss HS-1 and HS-2L flying boats.  Of the DH-4's, the first six postwar examples, all virtually stock DH-4B's, arrived for duty with the 7th in February 1920, replacing the well-worn Curtiss R-6's and other earlier DH-4's.  By 16 February 1922, the squadron had seven "war-built" DH-4's, four DH-4B's, the solitary Curtiss JN-4H, three Curtiss JN-6's. By August, all but one of the "war-built" DH-4's had been scrapped and one of the DH-4B's had been converted to DH-4BP-1 (photographic) configuration.

By June 1927, the squadron, now in a very lean peacetime stance, had but eight aircraft. These consisted of four DH-4M's, a solitary DH-4B, a Loening OA-l and two Loening OA-1As.

In 1937, the 6th Group, which had been a composite unit since its establishment in 1919, became the 6th Bombardment Group. The squadron was equipped with Douglas B-18 Bolos, although a single Northrop A-17 Nomad was also assigned for a period, together with a Sikorsky OA-8.

By 1 February 1940, the assignment to the 6th Bombardment Group was changed to an attachment, as the unit was reassigned to the 19th Composite Wing and placed under the control of the Caribbean Air Force staff as one of the dedicated reconnaissance elements reporting to that headquarters. On 4 June 1941, it was assigned one Boeing B-17B Flying Fortress, the first production version of the Flying Fortress, which had been transferred to the command.  Obsolete as a bomber, the mission of the B-17B was long-range reconnaissance in the Canal Zone, although the aircraft retained its defensive machine guns for defense against any enemy aircraft it may encounter On 8 October 1941, it was once again assigned to the 6th Bombardment Group and, on 27 November, the unit moved from France Field to the newly constructed Howard Field on the Pacific side, where it received four additional B-17Bs.

World War II

After the Japanese Attack on Pearl Harbor the Squadron was almost immediately deployed to David Field, Panama. The Squadron's B-17 Flying Fortress aircraft deployed elsewhere (mainly to Guatemala City Airport) to begin the Pacific patrols in early January 1942.  The squadron was redesignated as the 397th Bombardment Squadron (Heavy) effective 22 April 1942.

The return to David Field came just in time for deployment of the unit as a whole from David to Talara Airfield, Peru, where it arrived on 18 August. From there the squadron undertook the Pacific patrol arc out to Seymour Airport in the Galápagos Islands and, sometimes, on to Guatemala City Airport. These flights continued, almost non-stop, through May 1943, when the unit was relieved and returned to Río Hato Field in Panama. The LB-30s retained their original British serial numbers throughout their service with the squadron.  Upon its return to Rio Hato on 4 May 1943, the 397th was transformed, as an entirely new cadre of personnel replaced the veterans of the Galapagos and earlier tours there. Three days later, the Squadron moved to Howard Field in the Canal Zone, although this was apparently a mere paper move of its headquarters, as the unit's aircraft and personnel actually remained at Rio Hato.

On 1 January 1944, the squadron received orders to deploy four of its LB-30s to France Field to participate in the search for several marauding German U-boats which were causing considerable alarm in the Caribbean. While at France Field, the aircraft also flew navigational and bombing exercises.

All of this was preparatory to the unit's deployment to the Galapagos Islands and, starting 7 April 1944, the ground echelon started movement to Balboa, Canal Zone, via truck for the transfer. The air element got four more B-24J's on 8 April and, with these, flew with the earlier two B-24J's and two B-24D's to Seymour Field in the Galapagos. Other missions, besides the normal long-distance patrols, saw 397th aircraft operating to Salinas Airport, Ecuador; Havana Airport, Cuba; Borinquen Field, Puerto Rico; Managua Airport, Nicaragua; Cartagena airport, Colombia and elsewhere throughout Central and South America.

In February 1945, the unit was relieved from duty in the Galapagos and returned to Rio Hato, where the unit ended the war, on 1 November 1946 when it was inactivated.

Reactivation in 2015
On 1 May 2015, the unit was redesignated 7th Reconnaissance Squadron. It was reactivated at Naval Air Station Sigonella, Sicily, Italy on 15 May, where it replaced Detachment 1, 69th Reconnaissance Group.  It is assigned to the 69th Group at Grand Forks Air Force Base, North Dakota.

Lineage
 Organized as  7th Aero Squadron on 29 March 1917
 Redesignated: 7th Squadron on 14 March 1921
 Redesignated: 7th Observation Squadron on 25 January 1925
 Redesignated: 7th Reconnaissance Squadron on 1 September 1937
 Redesignated: 7th Reconnaissance Squadron (Medium Range) on 6 December 1939
 Redesignated: 7th Reconnaissance Squadron (Heavy) on 20 November 1940
 Redesignated: 397th Bombardment Squadron (Heavy) on 11 May 1942
 Redesignated: 397th Bombardment Squadron, Heavy c. 1944
 Inactivated on 1 November 1946
 Redesignated 7th Reconnaissance Squadron on 1 May 2015
 Activated on 15 May 2015

Assignments
 Panama Canal Department, 29 March 1917
 3d Observation Group (later 6th Observation Group, 6th Composite Group, 6th Bombardment Group), 30 September 1919
 19th Composite Wing, 1 February 1940 (attached to 6th Bombardment Group)
 6th Bombardment Group, 25 February 1942
 VI Bomber Command, 1 November 1943 – 1 November 1946
 69th Reconnaissance Group, 15 May 2015 – present

Stations
 Ancon, Panama Canal Zone, 29 March 1917
 Corozal, Panama Canal Zone, 16 April 1917
 Empire, Panama Canal Zone, May 1917
 Fort Sherman, Panama Canal Zone, c. 29 August 1917
 Cristobal, Panama Canal Zone, March 1918
 Coco Walk (later France Field), Panama Canal Zone, May 1918
 Howard Field, Panama Canal Zone, 26 November 1941
 David Field, Panama, 11 December 1941
 Talara Airfield, Peru, 18 August 1942
 Rio Hato Army Air Base, Panama, c. 4 May 1943
 Seymour Island Army Airfield, Baltra, Galapagos Islands, c. 7 April 1944
 Rio Hato Army Air Base, Panama, c. 6 February 1945 – 1 November 1946
 Naval Air Station Sigonella, 15 May 2015 – present

Aircraft

 Curtiss R-4, 1917–1919
 Curtiss R-3, 1917–1919
 Curtiss R-6, 1918–1919
 Curtiss R-9, 1918–1919
 Curtiss JN-4, 1918–1919, 1919–1920
 Curtiss JN-6, 1919–1920
 Dayton-Wright DH-4, 1919–1931
 Curtiss HS-2L, 1919–1931 
 Loening 0A-1, 1927–1931
 Douglas 0–2, 1919–1931
 Thomas Morse 0–19, 1930–1937
 Douglas OA-4 Dolphin, 1930–1936
 Martin B-10, 1936–1939
 Douglas B-18 Bolo, 1938–1942
 Boeing B-17 Flying Fortress, 1941–1942
 Consolidated LB-30 Liberator, 1942–1944
 Northrop A-17A Nomad, 1943
 Consolidated B-24 Liberator, 1943–1946
 Northrop Grumman RQ-4 Global Hawk, 2015–present

See also

 List of American aero squadrons

References
 Notes

 Citations

Bibliography

 
 

 Further reading
 Hagdedorn, Dan (1995), Alae Supra Canalem: Wings Over the Canal, Turner Publishing,

External links
 AFHRA Document 00202312  6th Bomber Command 1912-1941
 AFHRA Document 00899478  USAF Southern Command History, 1920–1975
 AFHRA Document 00046226 397th Bombardment Squadron History, 1939–1941
 AFHRA Document 00046227 397th Bombardment Squadron History, 1941–1942

Military units and formations established in 1917
Bombardment squadrons of the United States Army Air Forces